This is a list of Cypriot football transfers for the 2017–18 winter transfer window by club. Only transfers of clubs in the Cypriot First Division are included.

The winter transfer window opened on 1 January 2018, although a few transfers took place prior to that date. The window closed at midnight on 1 February 2018. Players without a club may join one at any time, either during or in between transfer windows.

Cypriot First Division

AEK Larnaca

In:

Out:

AEL Limassol

In:

Out:

Alki Oroklini

In:

Out:

Anorthosis Famagusta

In:

Out:

APOEL

In:

Out:

Apollon Limassol

In:

Out:

Aris Limassol

In:

Out:

Doxa Katokopias

In:

Out:

Ermis Aradippou

In:

Out:

Ethnikos Achna

In:

Out:

Nea Salamina

In:

Out:

Olympiakos Nicosia

In:

Out:

Omonia

In:

Out:

Pafos

In:

Out:

Cypriot Second Division

AEZ Zakakiou

In:

Out:

Anagennisi Deryneia

In:

Out:

ASIL

In:

Out:

Ayia Napa

In:

Out:

Chalkanoras Idaliou

In:

Out:

Digenis Oroklinis

In:

Out:

Enosis Neon Paralimni

In:

Out:

Ethnikos Assia

In:

Out:

Karmiotissa

In:

Out:

Omonia Aradippou

In:

Out:

Othellos Athienou FC

In:

Out:

PAEEK

In:

Out:

P.O. Xylotymbou

In:

Out:

ENTHOI Lakatamia FC

In:

Out:

References

Cypriot
tran
Cypriot football transfers